Ploggensee is a lake in the Nordwestmecklenburg district in Mecklenburg-Vorpommern, Germany. At an elevation of 32.9 m, its surface area is 0.15 km2.

Lakes of Mecklenburg-Western Pomerania